The 10th Australian Academy of Cinema and Television Arts Awards (generally known as the AACTA Awards) is an award's ceremony to celebrate the best of Australian films and television of 2020. The main ceremony was held at The Star in Sydney and televised on Foxtel Arts and the Seven Network.

Feature film

Television

Documentary

Short film and online

Additional awards

References

Further reading 

AACTA Awards ceremonies
2020 in Australian cinema